The Standards is the thirteenth studio album by Cuban-American recording artist Gloria Estefan. The singer's first English-language album since 2011's Miss Little Havana, and her twenty-seventh overall, it was released on September 10, 2013 on Sony Masterworks. The album features a selection of covers of traditional pop standards from the Great American Songbook.

The album was nominated in the category of Best Traditional Pop Vocal Album for the 56th Grammy Awards.

Background
Releasing a covers album before where Estefan included her favorite tunes from all time, 1994 Hold Me, Thrill Me, Kiss Me was a commercial success which gave Gloria two big hits around the world, "Turn The Beat Around" and "Everlasting Love". However, a project was in the making since Estefan recorded in 1993 a duet with Frank Sinatra at his smash album Duets where Gloria changed her traditional dance-pop song for a more mature and soft sound in the cover of the ballad, "Come Rain Or Come Shine".

Estefan herself commented she grew up listening to songs of Sinatra, Johnny Mathis, Henry Mancini and other famous crooners, including Latinos, the reason for why she was thrilled to release an album fill with traditional songs known from the great American songbook. Gloria cited many times in some interviews, that her favorite song from all time was Carlos Gardel's most famous song, "El Día Que Me Quieras", which was written in an English-language translation, to be released as the lead single from the album, changed later in favor of "How Long This Has Been Going On?".  Estefan previously performed the song, with its original Spanish lyrics, as the closing number to her 2009 concert in Buenos Aires during the 90 Millas World Tour.

Recording

A total of 50 songs were chosen to be recorded for the album, recording only 16 songs that made it to the last cut, these songs were chosen by Estefan herself and Shelly Berg, the front leader and Dean of Music at the University of Miami's Frost School of Music, which worked with some greatest names in music such as Patti Austin, Elliott Smith and Arturo Sandoval, all before Estefan.

These songs were recorded completely with talented musicians dedicated to music of this genre, most of it, a complete work of an orchestra was used for the recording process. Some of the collaborations included on the album will feature artists like: Laura Pausini, Joshua Bell and Dave Koz.

Estefan tried to approach these standards with fresh ideas. First with "They Can't Take That Away From Me", they did an almost "Afro-Cuban feel meets the waltz", giving Estefan a sound known to her tunes. For Antonio Carlos Jobim's Brazilian classic "Eu Sei Que Vou Te Amar" Estefan composed English lyrics for the first-ever English version, "It's You I’ll Always Love" and composed Spanish lyrics as well as French-lyric. She also composed Spanish lyrics for Charlie Chaplin's "Smile" on which she sings with Laura Pausini in both the Spanish and Italian language. The recording of this song was principally inspired by the Michael Jackson and Natalie Cole version.

Promotion
Estefan started the promotion for The Standards era by announcing a one-night-only concert at the Royal Albert Hall, performing her new songs as well as some of her older hits in a different way. 

Oprah Winfrey also made news, when she and Estefan were spotted in Vero Beach at Gloria's favorite shopping stores while Winfrey was interviewing her about future projects. A week later, was announced that Estefan will take part of Miami's UM Frost Festival, which is dated for October 1 at the Gusman Concert Hall.

In the last week of July 2013, Estefan announced more promotional stops for her album in Europe and Brazil. She started at two stops in Brazil for the 25th anniversary of Só Pra Contrariar at their special concerts in São Paulo and Porto allegre on for August 4 and 9 2013. She also headlined the People en Español festival August 31 in San Antonio, Texas. At the same time, it was announced that Estefan would be the headliner of the international concert Night of the Proms, with eight dates scheduled for November 2013 at Antwerp and Rotterdam Ahoy.

She appeared on CBS This Morning Saturday the week of the album's U.S. release and performed the song "Good Morning Heartache" in front of original author of the song Ervin Drake. Estefan also made a mini-tour to South America and went to some talk-shows such as Fátima Bernardes in Brazil where she performed "Eu Sei Que Vou Te Amar", then she went to Buenos Aires to perform "El Día Que Me Quieras" and "Mi Tierra" at Susana Giménez talk show, there she stated that Gardel Institute gave her permission of making a transition to English-language of "El Día Que Me Quieras," and also told Giménez, it was Emilio's and her wedding song. She told they were working on the musical and looking for bilingual artists to the biographical performances of their lives. Estefan was also on the August 2013 AARP Magazine cover and Ocean Drive, on this latest, she had a photoshoot with some iconic and glamorous images.

A day before the American release, Estefan appeared promoting the album on different interview shows such as Larry Flick, with Perez Hilton as part of the SiriusXM's Town Hall program, with Ismael Cala at CALACNN.

Singles
On July 8, 2013 it was announced via Amazon.com that the lead single for the album, would be "How Long Has This Been Going On?" and that will be released at the same site on July 9, 2013 as  single download. That same date, the album pre-order was made available at the same store and iTunes Store.

Commercial performance
With the pre-order services on some major music-order services, The Standards was able to be one of the most "pre-ordered" albums at Amazon.com, becoming only a week before being released the #1 most waited album on the Vocal and Broadway & Vocalists categories. When it was released, the album went on to the top the charts of the Amazon.com service at the overall albums, Pop and remained at the same positions on Vocal and Broadway & Vocalists.

Track listing

Charts

Release history

References

External links
GloriaEstefan.com > Album

2013 albums
Gloria Estefan albums
Albums produced by Emilio Estefan
Traditional pop albums